The Evolution of Physics: The Growth of Ideas from Early Concepts to Relativity and Quanta is a science book for the lay reader. Written by the physicists Albert Einstein and Leopold Infeld, it traces the development of ideas in physics. It was originally published in 1938 by Cambridge University Press. It was a popular success, and was featured in a Time cover story.

Background of collaboration
Einstein agreed to write the book partly as a way to help Infeld financially. Infeld collaborated briefly in Cambridge with Max Born, before moving to Princeton, where he worked with Einstein at the Institute for Advanced Study. Einstein tried to get Infeld a permanent position there, but failed. Infeld came up with a plan to write a history of physics with Einstein, which was sure to be successful, and split the royalties. When he went to Einstein to pitch the idea, Infeld became incredibly tongue-tied, but he was finally able to stammer out his proposal. “This is not at all a stupid idea,” Einstein said. "Not stupid at all. We shall do it." The book was published by Simon & Schuster.

Book's point of view
In the book,  Albert Einstein pushed his realist approach to physics in defiance of much of quantum mechanics. Belief in an “objective reality,” the book argued, had led to great scientific advances throughout the ages, thus proving that it was a useful concept even if not provable. “Without the belief that it is possible to grasp reality with our theoretical constructions, without the belief in the inner harmony of our world, there could be no science,” the book declared. “This belief is and always will remain the fundamental motive for all scientific creation.”

In addition, Einstein used the text to defend the utility of field theories amid the advances of quantum mechanics. The best way to do that was to view particles not as independent objects but as a special manifestation of the field itself: "Could we not reject the concept of matter and build a pure field physics? We could regard matter as the regions in space where the field is extremely strong. A thrown stone is, from this point of view, a changing field in which the states of the greatest field intensity travel through space with the velocity of the stone."

Contents
The book has four chapters: The Rise of The Mechanical View; The Decline of the Mechanical View; Field, Relativity; and Quanta.

The third chapter (Field, Relativity) examines lines of force starting with gravitational fields (i.e., a physical collection of forces), moving on to descriptions of electric and magnetic fields.  The authors explain that they are attempting to "translate familiar facts from the language of fluids...into the new language of fields."  They state that the Faraday, Maxwell, and Hertz experiments led to modern physics. They describe how "The change of an electric field produced by the motion of a charge is always accompanied by a magnetic field."

The two pillars of the field theory (pp. 142–148)

The reality of the field (pp. 148–156)

Field and ether (pp. 156–160)

The mechanical scaffold (pp. 160–171)

Ether and motion (pp. 172–186)

Time, distance, relativity (pp. 186–202)

Relativity and mechanics (pp. 202–209)

The time-space continuum (pp. 209–220)

General relativity (pp. 220–226).

Reception

Partial list of reviews

Booklist v. 34 (Apr. 15 1938). 
New York Herald Tribune (May 8, 1938). 
The Boston Transcript (Apr. 30 1938). 
The Open Shelf (Mar. 1938). 
Commonweal v. 28 (July 8, 1938). 
Manchester Guardian (Apr. 12 1938). 
The Nation v. 146 (May 7, 1938).  
Nature v. 141 (May 21, 1938). 
The New Republic v. 94 (Apr. 20 1938). 
New Technical Books v. 23 (Apr. 1938). 
The New York Times (Early City Edition) (Apr. 10 1938).
Pratt Institute Quarterly List of New Technical and Industry Books (winter 1939). 
Saturday Review of Literature v. 17 (Apr. 2 1938).
Scientific Book Club Review v. 9 (Mar. 1938). 
Spectator v. 161 (Aug. 26 1938).
Springfield Republican (July 3, 1938). 
Survey Graphic v. 27 (Dec. 1938). 
The Times Literary Supplement (Apr. 9 1938). 
The Yale Review v. 27 (summer 1938).

See also
 The Feynman Lectures on Physics (Feynman)
 The Physical Principles of the Quantum Theory (Heisenberg)
 The Principles of Quantum Mechanics (Dirac)

References

 The Evolution of Physics, Albert Einstein & Leopold Infeld, 1938, Edited by C.P. Snow, Cambridge University Press, ASIN: B000S52QZ4 
 The Evolution of Physics from Early Concepts to Relativity and Quanta, Albert Einstein & Leopold Infeld, 1966, Simon & Schuster, ASIN: B0011Z6VBK 
 The Evolution of Physics, Albert Einstein & Leopold Infeld, 1967, Touchstone.

External links 
Free book download on the right of the page, different formats (download at June 05, 2016)

1938 non-fiction books
Books about the history of physics
Cambridge University Press books
English-language books
English non-fiction books
Philosophy of science books
Popular physics books
Works by Albert Einstein